Wahba is a both a given name and a surname.

People with the given name
Wahba Zuhayli (1932–2015), Syrian Islamic scholar specializing in Islamic law and legal philosophy

People with the surname
Ahmed Bushara Wahba (born 1943), Sudanese football player
Grace Wahba (born 1934), American academic and statistician
Hedaya Malak Wahba (born 1993), Egyptian taekwondo practitioner
Hafiz Wahba (1889–1967), Egypt-born Saudi Arabian government official
Magdi Wahba (1925–1991), Egyptian university professor, Johnsonian scholar, and lexicographer
Marcelle Wahba, American diplomat
Mourad Wahba (1879-1972), Egyptian jurist and politician
Mustafa Wahba, Saudi politician
Rachel Wahba (born 1946), therapist and an author of her own book; a memoir about her family
Sadek Wahba (born 1965), American economist and investor
Youssef Wahba (1852–1934), Egyptian politician and jurist

Arabic masculine given names
Arabic-language surnames